Feroz (International Title: Fierce) is a Chilean telenovela broadcast in Canal 13. It was going to be first aired on February 28, 2010, but it was postponed until March 8 due to the February 27 earthquake that caused massive damage in Chile.

Cast 
 Cristián Campos as Guillermo Bernard
 Ignacio Garmendia as Leonardo "Leo" Cruz
 Tamara Acosta as Soledad Gutiérrez
 Patricia López as Kiara Montero Main heroine, main villain
 Manuela Martelli as Amanda Carrera
 Carolina Arregui as Carmen Ramírez
 Blanca Lewin as Ángela Carrera
 Mario Horton as Pablo Gutiérrez
 María José Bello as Monserrat Tagle
 Cristóbal Tapia-Montt as Damián Cruz
 Pablo Schwartz as Jacinto Fonseca
 Lorena Bosch as Mónica Parráguez / Sofía Brunet
 Ramón Llao as René Sanhueza
 Lorene Prieto as Olga Bolados
 Juan Falcón as Tomás Hernández
 Elisa Zulueta as Valentina "Tina" Sanhueza
 Carolina Paulsen as Rosa Telías
 Francisco Gormaz as Ignacio "Nacho" Irarrázabal
 Catalina González as Ana Karen Telías
 Alfredo Allende as Jorge "Coke" Alfaro
 Belén Soto as Isidora Tagle Ramírez
 Simón Gelsich as Benjamín Cruz
 Tomás Verdejo as Gabriel Hernández
 Mayte Rodríguez as Lorena Salazar
 Ingrid Parra as Gloria "Yoya" Hernández
 Agustín Moya as Elías "El loco" Carrera

Special participations 
 Pablo Krögh as Andrés Cruz
 Felipe Álvarez as Jairo
 Luciana Echeverría as Danae Suicx
 José Secall as Hugo Navarro
 Maria Elena Duvauchelle as Marta Soto
 Peggy Cordero as Chepa
 Sonia Mena as Renata
 Mauricio Diocares as Eric Molina
 Leonor Varela as Laura Palma
 Aldo Bernales as Perro Inostroza
 Eduardo Topelberg as Atila
 Isidora Cabezón as Profesora
 Araceli Vitta as Adriana Cooper
 Alessandra Guerzoni as Bethania McLean
 Rodrigo Achondo as Rómulo
 Alex Zissis as Gonzalo Tagle
 Julio César Serrano as Barman

See also 
 Martín Rivas
 Manuel Rodríguez

External links 
  

Chilean telenovelas
2010 telenovelas
2010 Chilean television series debuts
2010 Chilean television series endings
Canal 13 (Chilean TV channel) telenovelas
Television shows set in Santiago
Spanish-language telenovelas